Payzac is a commune in the Dordogne department in Nouvelle-Aquitaine in southwestern France.

Population

History
The commune was written as Peisac, Peyzac, Paysac and since the late-19th century: Payzac.  The official name Payzac replaced the older name Payzac-de-Lanouaille in 1961.

During the French Revolution on Friday 23 August 1793, the communes of Boisseuilh, Coubjours, Génis, Payzac, Saint-Cyr-les-Champagnes, Saint Mesmin, Salagnac, Savignac, Saint-Trié (Sainte-Trie) and Teillots were detached from the Corrèze department, and reunited to the Dordogne department.

The commune is well known for its Rugby team "l'USPS" (lit. Payzac-Savignac Sporting Union), champion of France 3 in 2000 and in the Périgord-Agenais "regional honor promotion league" in 2007/2008.

Mayors
A partial list of lords and mayors of Payzac:
 1345-6 Charles de Blois and Jeanne de Penthievre, duke and duchess of Brittany, viscount and viscountess of Limoges 
 , count of Penthièvre, viscount of Limoges, lord of Payzac
-1453: , viscount of Limoges, lord of Payzac
1453-1455: , count of, viscount of Limoges, lord of Payzac
1455-1481: , countess of Périgord, viscountess of Limoges, dame (lady) of Paysac
1481-1516: Jean d'Albret, king of Navarre, count of Périgord, viscount of Limoges, lord of Payzac
1516-1555 - Henri d'Albret, king of Navarre, count of Périgord, viscount of Limoges, lord of Payzac
1555-?: Jeanne d'Albret, queen of Navarre, countess of Périgord, viscountess of Limoges, lady of Paysac
?-1609: Henry IV, king of France and Navarre, count of Périgord, viscount of Limoges, lord of Paysac
1713-1741: François du Mas de Paysac, lord marquess of Paysac
1741-?: Joseph-François du Mas de Paysac, lord marquess of Paysac
?-1789: Charles-Odet du Mas de Paysac, lord marquess of Paysac
1790s: Coustillas, mayor
February 1800: Degrassat
6 June 1811: Jean-Baptiste Eyssartier
30 September 1815: Lajugie-Larnaudie
April 1817: Leonard Rupin
9 August 1832: Pierre Coustillas
15 May 1852: Piere Joussein
February, 1875-?: Pierre Joussein
July 1899 - 1911: Gustave le Clare
1908-:  Dr. Dupinet
1919-1945: Charles le Clere
mid-20th century: Feuillard
2001-2008: François le Clere
2008-2014: Jean-Michel Lamassiaude

Personalities
Payzac was the birthplace of:
 Jean-Pierre Timbaud

See also
Communes of the Dordogne department

References

External links

 Payzac - Savignac Lédrier School
 Auvézère Djembé, an African culture association for Payzac and Savignac-Lédrier

Communes of Dordogne
Arrondissement of Nontron
Limousin